Operation Rajiv was the codename for an Indian Army operation that aimed to capture a high point along the Actual Ground Position Line (AGPL) on the Siachen Glacier in June 1987. Prior to this operation, the area had been under the control of Pakistani forces, who had established a post on the peak, designated Quaid Post (named after the founding father of Pakistan, Muhammad Ali Jinnah). Following India's successful capture of the peak, the post was renamed to Bana Top (also called Bana Post) after Naib Subedar (later Honorary Captain) Bana Singh, who led the operation. Since Operation Rajiv in 1987, India continues to hold this post, which lies just to the south of the strategic Bilafond La mountain pass, also controlled by India. Alongside the higher-altitude installations, India has also established posts on the slopes at lower heights (named Amar and Sonam) in this sector.

The operation was sanctioned due to the danger posed by the Pakistanis, who were until this point in control of this area. Pakistan's establishment of the Quaid Post on this peak threatened Indian movement on the western Siachen Glacier. An Indian task force, led by Major Varinder Singh, launched multiple attacks on the Pakistani troops stationed at the post in an attempt to capture it. After three unsuccessful attempts, a team led by Naib Subedar Bana Singh successfully captured the peak. Following its capture, Singh was awarded the Param Vir Chakra, India's highest gallantry award, for his courage in this operation. The operation was named after Second Lieutenant Rajiv Pande, who had been killed during earlier attempts by India to capture the peak from Pakistan.

Background

India's Operation Meghdoot and Pakistan's counter operations 

The Siachen area, which lies in a territory disputed by India and Pakistan, is the highest battleground on earth. In 1984, India captured the area during Operation Meghdoot.  In April 1986, the Pakistanis established a military post where, prior to the Pakistani capture, the Indians called the peak the "Left Shoulder" of the Bilafond La. The Pakistanis named the peak "Quaid Post" in honour of their leader Quaid-e-Azam Muhammad Ali Jinnah. The Quaid Post was manned by soldiers of the Shaheen Company (3rd commando battalion), a part of Pakistan's Special Services Group. It was commanded by Subedar Ataullah Mohammed.

Quaid, Amar and Sonam posts 

The Pakistani position at Quaid Post the peak gave them a clear view of the Indian movement in the Saltoro-Siachen area. The Siachen glacier, located about 15 km away, could be seen from this peak with the naked eye. The Indian posts in the Bilafond La area, such as Amar Post and Sonam Post, were accessible only by air. Amar was located to the south of the Quaid Post, while Sonam was located to its north. Pakistan's control of the Quaid Post allowed them to dominate these posts, and prevent supplies to them.

It was extremely difficult to attack, as it was surrounded by 457 m high ice walls. It had an inclination of 80° to 85° on three sides, less on the fourth side. It was very difficult for the attackers to climb up the peak without getting noticed by the Pakistani soldiers stationed at the top. The scarcity of oxygen made walking long distances difficult, as the troops had to halt every few meters to regain their breath. There were also frequent blizzards, and taking advantage of poor visibility at night was difficult due to the wind chill factor. The minimum temperatures in the area were as low as −50 °C at that time.

In December 1986, Quaid Post was hit by a deadly blizzard which killed all of the Pakistani garrison except one artillery officer, Lt Zafar Abbasi who lost his both legs and hands due to frostbite. Later on, he continued his services with artificial legs and hands until he reached the rank of Lt. Colonel and became famous in Pakistan due to his bravery. The other soldiers, who were from a Special Services group, including Captain Akmal Khan, died on the spot as the temperature hit −40.

Attack on Indian Amar and Sonam posts from Pakistan's Quaid Post 

On 18 April 1987, the Pakistani troops at Quaid Post fired on the Indian soldiers at Sonam (6,400 m), killing two of them. The Indian Army then launched a plan to evict the Pakistanis from the Quaid Post. The 8th Battalion of the Jammu and Kashmir Light Infantry (8th JAK LI) was given the task of capturing the Quaid Post. On May 29, a 13-member JAK LI patrol led by Second Lieutenant Rajiv Pande was asked to identify the best approach route to the Post, and mark it with ropes. The group started climbing the ice wall leading to the Quaid Post, but were detected by the Pakistani soldiers, when it was just 30 m from the top. The Pakistanis opened fire with a heavy machine gun, killing ten Indian soldiers, including Second Lieutenant Rajiv Pande. Before they were killed, the Indian soldiers managed to establish a number of footholds on the vertical ice wall with a pick axe, and had laid a rope to the top.

The Indian operation

Etymology 

The operation was named after India's Second Lieutenant Rajiv Pande, who had been killed by Pakistanis during an earlier attempt to capture the peak.

Preparation – Assembling the Indian task force 

Over the next few days, the JAK LI assembled a new task force led by Major Varinder Singh to capture the Quaid Post. Captain Anil Sharma was assigned as Singh's deputy. The task force included 62 people, including 2 officers, 3 JCOs and 57 soldiers. The assignment, launched on 23 June 1987, was code-named Operation Rajiv in honour of Second Lieutenant Rajiv Pande.

The task force established a base in the Bilafond La area. The 8th JAK LI had taken over the area from 5th Bihar just over a month back, and its soldiers were still in the process of getting to know the area. Because of the frequent blizzards and limited capacity of the HAL Cheetah helicopters, it took 20 days and 200 helicopter trips for the assault team to gather at Bilafond La. To ferry two people and their supplies, a minimum of 2–4 helicopter trips were required. Each helicopter trip cost  35,000.

During the rehearsals, some artillery observers had to be evacuated due to altitude sickness. A 10-man team led by Captain Ram Prakash was placed at the Sonam Post. He established an observation post ahead of Sonam.

Initial Indian assault 

On the evening of 23 June, a platoon led by Varinder Singh set out to find the rope fixed by Pande's patrol. The bad weather slowed down the group: it could travel only 1 km in four hours, in waist-deep snow. Due to heavy snowfall, the team could not find the rope, and retreated to the base.

Harnam Singh's team 

On the night of 24 June, a 10-men team led by Subedar Harnam Singh was sent out. Another team led by Subedar Sansar Chand followed it at a distance. A third team led by Naib Subedar Bana Singh was kept as a reserve force to be deployed in case the first assault team was stalled due to enemy fire. Harnam Singh's team managed to find the rope and the dead bodies of Pande's patrol. The Indian soldiers started climbing the ice wall. They had barely covered a distance of 50 m, when their scout Naik Tara Chand noticed some movement in the front. Alerted by Tara Chand, the Indian soldiers started moving down. But before they could take up the firing positions, the Pakistanis opened fire with medium machine guns. Tara Chand and two others were killed instantaneously. The troops following them were unable to fire back as their weapons had jammed in the −25 °C temperature. Later, the Indians found that the Pakistanis were heating their weapons with a kerosene stove kept below the weapon. Harnam Singh's men first took shelter behind icicles, and then hurriedly dug shallow trenches in the ice. The Indian artillery designated to cover them could not be used to full extent, as there was danger of them being hurt. Ultimately, the attack had to be abandoned.

The wounded soldiers were later brought to the base, and evacuated via helicopters. Their reliefs were dispatched promptly. The Indians also heard helicopters making regular trips on the Pakistani side. While bringing the bodies of their two dead colleagues to the base, the Indians also discovered the bodies of Rajiv Pande and Naib Subedar Hem Raj. Although the two had been killed a month earlier, their bodies had been preserved in the ice.

Sansar Chand's team 

On the night of 25–26 June, Subedar Sansar Chand's team led the attack on the Quaid Post, with the remainder of the force following at a distance. The team advanced towards the Post, supported by the medium machine gun fire from the Garden post and rocket launcher fire from the post established by Ram Prakash ahead of the Sonam post. Other support teams with light machine guns had also been deployed to facilitate the advance of Sansar Chand's men. However, these guns jammed due to cold weather. The Pakistani side also continuously used machine gun and rocket fire to stop the Indian advance.

Sansar Chand reached near the top of the Quaid Post, and wanted additional troops to rush in immediately. However, the battery of his radio set died, and he could not communicate with his Commander, who was located just 100 m behind him. He then asked Havildar Ram Dutt to move down and reach out to the rest of the Indian team. However, Ram Dutt got hit by the Pakistani fire while moving down, and fell almost 500 feet to his death. His body could never be recovered. Once again, the attack had to be abandoned in absence of additional fire support.

Final Indian assault – Bana Singh's team 

By the morning of 26 June, both Indian and Pakistani soldiers had nearly run out of supplies, having spent three nights in extremely cold weather. The Quaid Post was held by 7-to-17 Pakistani soldiers at the time. The Pakistani troops seemed to be running low on ammunition, as firing from their side had reduced considerably. By this time, the weather had also improved, with the temperatures just below 0 °C. The Indians' weapons had started working.

Realizing that the supplies would not last until night, Varinder decided to launch a decisive daytime attack from two sides. The first team comprised 8 men, and was led by Varinder Singh. The second team comprised 5 men, and was led by Naib Subedar Bana Singh. The brigade commander Brigadier Chandan Nugyal contacted Varinder over radio, and promised him fire support from every Indian artillery gun in the range. After a massive artillery barrage, Varinder's team outflanked Quaid from below.

The team led by Bana Singh launched the final assault at 1330 hours on 26 June 1987. Beside Bana Singh, the group included Riflemen Chuni Lal, Laxman Das, Om Raj and Kashmir Chand. This team approached the Quaid Post from an unexpected direction, using a longer and more difficult approach. There was a blizzard, resulting in poor visibility, which gave cover to the Indian soldiers. Bana Singh's team reached the top of the peak, and found that there was a single Pakistani bunker. They approached the bunker from behind, but realized that their rifles were jammed. Bana Singh then lobbed a grenade into the bunker and closed the door, killing those inside. The two sides also got involved in a hand-to-hand combat, in which the Indian soldiers bayoneted some of the Pakistani soldiers outside the bunker. A few Pakistani soldiers jumped off the peak. Later, the Indians found six dead bodies of Pakistani soldiers.

The Indian Army finally gained control of the post. Varinder Singh was severely wounded by an artillery shell after the post was captured.

In her book, Defeat Is an Orphan: How Pakistan Lost the Great South Asian War, Myra MacDonald wrote: Against all odds, India captured the post after an operation that involved scaling ice-walls by stealth followed by hand-to-hand fighting with grenades and bayonets at 20,500 feet. On top of the original occupation of Siachen in 1984, the loss of the Pakistani post in 1987 became an added humiliation that dug deeply into the psyche of the Pakistan Army. A Pakistani counterattack on other Indian posts later that year largely failed.

Aftermath

Handover of Pakistani dead bodies 

The Indian Army handed over the bodies of Pakistani soldiers to the Pakistani authorities during a flag meet in Kargil.

Gallantry awards 

Bana Singh was awarded Param Vir Chakra in 1988 for his courage during the Operation. Rifleman Chuni Lal, and Rifleman Om Raj who accompanied him during the final assault, was awarded Sena Medal. Harnam Singh and Sansar Chand was awarded Mahavir Chakra. 7 others, including Major Varinder Singh, 2nd Lt. Rajiv Pande  were awarded Vir Chakra.

Renaming of Quaid Post to Bana Top 
After capturing highest peak in the Siachen area from Pakistan, India renamed Quaid Post to Bana Top to honor the contribution and bravery of Bana Singh in the capture of peak.

See also 

Near the AGPL (Actual Ground Position Line)
 NJ9842 (peak) LoC ends and AGPL begins here 
 Gharkun (peak)
 Gyong Kangri (peak)
 Gyong La (pass)
 Goma (Siachen)
 Gyari (valley) 
 Chumik Kangri (peak)
 K12 (mountain) (peak)
 Bilafond La
 Saltoro Valley
 Ghent Kangri
 Sia La
 Sia Kangri
 Indira Col

 Borders
 Actual Ground Position Line (AGPL)
 India–Pakistan International Border (IB)
 Line of Control (LoC)
 Line of Actual Control (LAC)
 Sir Creek (SC)
 Borders of China
 Borders of India
 Borders of Pakistan

 Conflicts
 Kashmir conflict
 Siachen conflict
 Sino-Indian conflict
 List of disputed territories of China
 List of disputed territories of India
 List of disputed territories of Pakistan
 Northern Areas
 Trans-Karakoram Tract

 Operations
 Operation Meghdoot, by India
 Operation Safed Sagar, by India

 Other related topics
 Awards and decorations of the Indian Armed Forces
 Bana Singh, after whom Quaid Post was renamed to Bana Top 
 Dafdar, westernmost town in Trans-Karakoram Tract
 India-China Border Roads
 List of extreme points of India
 Sino-Pakistan Agreement for transfer of Trans-Karakoram Tract to China

References 

Rajiv
Rajiv
Siachen conflict
1987 in India
Rajiv